Daniele Russo (born 3 July 1973) is an Italian football manager who is assistant manager of Adana Demirspor.

Playing career

Russo started his playing career with Italian fourth division side Piombino. In 1994, he signed for Centense in the Italian third division. In 1995, Russo signed for Italian second division club Perugia, where he made 17 league appearances and scored 0 goals. In 1996, he signed for Pistoiese in the Italian third division. Before the second half of 1996–97, Russo signed for Italian second division team Castel di Sangro. In 2000, he signed for Viterbese in the Italian third division. In 2003, he signed for Italian second division outfit Pescara. In 2005, Russo signed for Italian third division side Atletico Roma.

Managerial career

In 2011, he was appointed assistant manager of Catania in the Italian Serie A. In 2016, he was appointed assistant of Italian Serie A club Milan. In 2017, Russo was appointed assistant manager of Sevilla in Spain. In 2019, he was appointed assistant manager of Italian club Fiorentina. In 2021, Russo was appointed assistant manager if Adana Demirspor in Turkey.

References

Living people
1973 births
Italian footballers
Italian football managers
A.C. Perugia Calcio players
U.S. Pistoiese 1921 players
A.S.D. Castel di Sangro Calcio players
U.S. Viterbese 1908 players
L'Aquila Calcio 1927 players
Delfino Pescara 1936 players
Atletico Roma F.C. players
Footballers from Rome
Association footballers not categorized by position
Atletico Piombino players